Celaenaclystis celaenacris is a moth in the  family Geometridae. It is found on Borneo.

The forewings are grey and black with ochreous ante- and postmedial fasciae. The male hindwings are much more roughly scaled on the underside than those of the female.

References

Moths described in 1932
Eupitheciini
Moths of Indonesia